The 1966–67 Spartan League season was the 49th in the history of Spartan League. The league consisted of 17 teams.

League table

The division featured 17 teams, 16 from last season and 1 new team:
 Berkhamsted, from Athenian League Division Two

References

1966-67
9